Theater der Schatten is a theatre in Bavaria, Germany.

Theatres in Bavaria